The Skeptic is a British non-profit skepticism magazine. It describes itself as "the UK’s longest running and foremost sceptical magazine, which examines science, skepticism, secularism, critical thinking and claims of the paranormal."

History, format and structure
The Skeptic was founded in 1987 by Wendy M. Grossman, and subsequently edited from 1988 to 1998 by Toby Howard (The University of Manchester, UK) and Steve Donnelly (University of Huddersfield, UK). From 1998 to 2011 it was edited by Chris French, and from 2011 to 2020 by Deborah Hyde.

Since 2020 magazine has been edited by Michael Marshall and Alice Howarth, and published by the Merseyside Skeptics Society. Regular columnists and authors contributing articles to the publication have included Mark Duwe, Chris French, Wendy M Grossman, Mike Heap, Paul Taylor and Mark Williams. Neil Davies routinely provides artwork for the cover, whilst centrefold pieces were contributed by Crispian Jago. Other artwork is routinely contributed by Donald Rooum, Tim Pearce, Andrew Endersby and Barbara Griffiths.

The magazine is also supported by an Editorial Advisory Board which includes, among others: James Alcock, Susan Blackmore, Derren Brown, David Colquhoun, Brian Cox, and Richard Dawkins.

Podcast
In 2008, an independent, rationalist talk show airing on London's Resonance FM called Little Atoms became The Official Podcast of The Skeptic Magazine. New episodes of the show are released on an almost weekly basis. The show has been produced by Neil Denny, Padraig Reidy, Anthony Burn and Richard Sanderson since September 2005.

Ockham Awards 

The Skeptic magazine annually awards the Ockham Awards, or simply the Ockhams, at QED. This occurred for the first time in 2012, and the award ceremony has been considered a highlight of the conference ever since. The Ockhams were introduced by editor-in-chief Deborah Hyde to "recognise the effort and time that have gone into the community’s favourite skeptical blogs, skeptical podcasts, skeptical campaigns and outstanding contributors to the skeptical cause." The winners are selected by a panel, from submissions by the skeptical community. The ironic award 'for the most audacious pseudo-science', "The Rusty Razor" (introduced in 2017), is determined entirely by public vote. "The Editors' Choice Award" is a special Ockham without a category, chosen by the current and past editors-in-chief of The Skeptic, Chris French, Wendy Grossman and Deborah Hyde.

The name refers to Ockham's razor, formulated by English philosopher William of Ockham (c. 1285–1347). The trophies, designed by Neil Davies and Karl Derrick, carry the upper text "Ockham's" and the lower text "The Skeptic. Shaving away unnecessary assumptions since 1285." Between the texts, there is an image of a double-edged safety razorblade, and both lower corners feature an image of William of Ockham's face.

See also
 Scientific skepticism
 Skeptical Inquirer
 Skeptic (U.S. magazine)
 The Freethinker journal
 The Skeptic's Dictionary

References

External links
 Official website

1987 establishments in the United Kingdom
Magazines established in 1987
Paranormal magazines
Quarterly magazines published in the United Kingdom
Secularism in the United Kingdom
Science and technology magazines published in the United Kingdom
Scientific skepticism mass media